Rogers is a village in eastern Columbiana County, Ohio, United States. The population was 194 at the 2020 census.

Located along the Little Bull Creek and the Youngstown and Southeastern Railroad, it is best known for the Rogers Flea Market & Auction, one of the largest open-air flea markets in Ohio.

History
Rogers had its start in the year 1883 by the building of the Pittsburgh, Lisbon and Western Railroad through the territory. It was named for its founder, T. G. Rogers. Rogers was incorporated as a village in 1895.

Mount Hope College
Mount Hope College was an academy in central Rogers, located on Highland Avenue. In 1894, the academy burned, but was rebuilt the same year. Brothers Asher A. Galbreath and Charles Burleigh Galbreath bought the academy in 1894. In 1905, the college was changed to a correspondence school named Carnegie College, and later to a public school. The public school, Rogers Area School, served students in grades 1-8. The structure was again destroyed by fire in January 1951. The successor schoolhouse, built on Sprucevale Road in southern Rogers, would become the Rogers Elementary School, serving under the Beaver Local School District until demolition in 2015.

Geography
Rogers is located at  (40.790549, -80.625501).

The following highways pass through Rogers: 
   State Route 7
   State Route 154

Demographics

2010 census
As of the census of 2010, there were 237 people, 85 households, and 66 families living in the village. The racial makeup of the village was 98.3% White, 0.4% African American, and 1.3% from two or more races.

There were 85 households, of which 37.6% had children under the age of 18 living with them, 48.2% were married couples living together, 22.4% had a female householder with no husband present, 7.1% had a male householder with no wife present, and 22.4% were non-families. 16.5% of all households were made up of individuals, and 7.1% had someone living alone who was 65 years of age or older. The average household size was 2.79 and the average family size was 3.05.

The median age in the village was 39.3 years. 21.1% of residents were under the age of 18; 13% were between the ages of 18 and 24; 23.6% were from 25 to 44; 30.8% were from 45 to 64; and 11.4% were 65 years of age or older. The gender makeup of the village was 47.7% male and 52.3% female.

2000 census
As of the census of 2000, there were 266 people, 95 households, and 72 families living in the village. The population density was 1,132.4 people per square mile (446.5/km). There were 99 housing units at an average density of 421.5 per square mile (166.2/km). The racial makeup of the village was 99.25% White, and 0.75% from two or more races. Hispanic or Latino of any race were 0.75% of the population.

There were 95 households, out of which 45.3% had children under the age of 18 living with them, 55.8% were married couples living together, 14.7% had a female householder with no husband present, and 24.2% were non-families. 21.1% of all households were made up of individuals, and 10.5% had someone living alone who was 65 years of age or older. The average household size was 2.80 and the average family size was 3.19.

In the village, the population was spread out, with 30.8% under the age of 18, 7.9% from 18 to 24, 35.3% from 25 to 44, 16.5% from 45 to 64, and 9.4% who were 65 years of age or older. The median age was 33 years. For every 100 females there were 111.1 males. For every 100 females age 18 and over, there were 106.7 males.

The median income for a household in the village was $31,250, and the median income for a family was $33,036. Males had a median income of $30,625 versus $18,750 for females. The per capita income for the village was $12,055. About 15.5% of families and 14.7% of the population were below the poverty line, including 15.1% of those under the age of eighteen and 21.7% of those 65 or over.

Government
Rogers operates under a mayor–council government, where there are six council members elected as a legislature in addition to an independently elected mayor who serves as an executive. The current mayor is Amy R. Burkey.

Education
Children in Rogers are served by the Beaver Local School District. The current schools serving Rogers are:
 Beaver Local Elementary School –  grades K-4
 Beaver Local Middle School – grades 5-8
 Beaver Local High School – grades 9-12

Rogers Flea Market
Since 1955, Rogers has been home to Rogers Community Auction and Flea Market. The market has an assortment of vendors including produce, clothing, novelties, and antiques. It is located off Ohio State Route 154, with access also available from Ohio State Route 7.

Weekly events include the weekly Friday flea market, with auctions of household items, antiques, farm fresh produce and livestock. Hays and grains are auctioned on Wednesdays, and the second Tuesday of each month is reserved for the equipment/consignment auction.

On July 25, 2014, the U.S. Immigration and Customs Enforcement raided more than one dozen vendors at the flea market for selling counterfeit consumer goods. The merchandise seized was worth over US$500,000. The sale of counterfeit goods violated the flea market's policies. The flea market resumed normal business on August 8.

On September 18, 2019, hay barrels inside a pavilon at the flea market caught fire and engulfed the entire structure within minutes.

References

Villages in Columbiana County, Ohio
Villages in Ohio
1883 establishments in Ohio
Populated places established in 1883